Diane Simpson (born April 7, 1969, in Evanston, Illinois) is an American athlete, an Olympian and an eight-time Rhythmic gymnastics national team member, and was inducted into the USA Gymnastics Hall of Fame, Class of 2004. She is a media marketing communications consultant who writes, produces and manages talent and events for clients, sponsors and stakeholders.

She qualified a spot for the United States into the 1988 Summer Olympics and 1992 Summer Olympic Games. She was inducted into the Evanston Township High School Athletic Hall of Fame.

Simpson won more than 20 international medals, three Olympic Festival titles, and 22 national titles – including winning all four event finals and the All-Around title at the 1988 U.S. National Championships in San Rafael, California. – during her career.

Competitive history
1985 World Rhythmic Gymnastics Championships
1986 Goodwill Games –
Finals
1986 Four Continents Championships competition
1987 Pan American Games
Won two gold medals and two silver medals at the Pan American Games in Indianapolis in 1987.
1987 World Rhythmic Gymnastics Championships
1988 Four Continents Championships competition
1988 Summer Olympics Team
One of two rhythmic gymnasts on the 1988 U.S. Olympic Team -- the third of nine American individual rhythmic gymnasts ever to qualify for the Olympic Games.
1989 World Rhythmic Gymnastics Championships
Finals competitor
1990 Goodwill Games
1990 Four Continents Championships competition
1991 World Rhythmic Gymnastics Championships
1991 Pan American Games
Won the bronze medal at the team event at the 1991 Pan American Games in Havana, Cuba.
1992 Won the Mariana Grajalas competition in Cuba
2004 United States Gymnastics Hall of Fame

Business career

Education and work
Simpson graduated from Northwestern University’s Medill School of Journalism with a double major in journalism and political science (Honors)  and worked as a media relations and events specialist at the College of American Pathologists. She was manager of athlete relations and communications at Chicago 2016 and a writer for the Chicago Sun-Times for 10 years before her work with Diane Simpson Consulting.

She  has worked news broadcasting in  Chicago and with other national television news and radio stations, including WJWJ-TV in Beaufort, South Carolina, WBBM-TV, WMAQ-TV, WFLD-TV FOX 32, WMVP-AM 1000. She returned to writing news for CBS Channel 2 in 2015.

She has also served as advance, fundraiser and as Illinois press coordinator for Sen. John Kerry for President in 2004.

Currently she works as activation media marketing communications producer/writer and event project manager for clients.

Chicago 2016 Olympics bid
Simpson held the role of manager of athlete relations and communications for the Chicago bid for the 2016 Summer Olympics from 2006 to 2009.
She accompanied about 20 Olympians and elite athletes—including Jackie Joyner-Kersee, Michael Johnson, Edwin Moses, Nastia Liukin, Bart Conner, Nadia Comăneci, Willie Banks, Dikembe Mutombo, David Robinson, Brandi Chastain and David Diaz—to Copenhagen, Denmark, for the 2016 Olympic Games Host City announcement that took place Oct. 2, 2009.

Post-Olympics career
Simpson is the president of the Midwest Chapter of U.S. Olympians and Paralympians, the regional chapter of the U.S. Olympians Association.  Her term began in 2006 and she was re-elected in 2012. She also serves as secretary of the Female Athlete Triad Coalition, a 501(c)(3) global health advocacy collaboration.

She lives with her two children, Alexis (21), and Jonathan (14.)

She has been certified as an American College of Sports Medicine Certified Personal Trainer.

Media appearances

Film and television
Served as a Turner Sports commentator at the 1998 Goodwill Games.
Performer in "Best Years of Our Lives" music video for BaHa Men.

Performer in 1989 American Music Awards. Miss Moscow News, 1988.

Magazines, newspapers
Appeared in Mademoiselle in 1989. The magazine ceased publication in 2001.

See also
List of gymnasts
Rhythmic Gymnastics World Championships
Fédération Internationale de Gymnastique
Olympians for Olympians Fund

References

External links

U.S. Olympians & Paralympians Association—Midwest  *
Olympians for Olympians Relief Fund (OORF) *

USA Gymnastics Hall of Fame: *
US Olympians Association *
US Olympians Leadership Team 2009-2012  *

1969 births
Living people
Gymnasts at the 1988 Summer Olympics
Olympic gymnasts of the United States
Sportspeople from Evanston, Illinois
American rhythmic gymnasts
Evanston Township High School alumni
Pan American Games medalists in gymnastics
Pan American Games gold medalists for the United States
Pan American Games silver medalists for the United States
Pan American Games bronze medalists for the United States
Gymnasts at the 1987 Pan American Games
Competitors at the 1986 Goodwill Games
Competitors at the 1990 Goodwill Games
Medalists at the 1987 Pan American Games
21st-century American women